The Middleton Junction and Oldham Branch Railway (MJOBR) was opened on 31 March 1842 by the Manchester and Leeds Railway, whose chief engineer was George Stephenson. The  MJOBR left the Manchester to Littleborough railway line (opened on 4 July 1839), at Middleton Junction (then Oldham Junction) went through the expanding town of Chadderton to a station in the lower part of Oldham named Werneth. It was part of the original route to Oldham. The earliest trains to use this line required cable assistance to get to the top of the incline.

Expansion
The railway did not prosper in its first few years and plans were quickly made for the railway line to come nearer the town centre of Oldham. An extension was built to Oldham Mumps railway station, including an intermediate station at Oldham Central railway station. The line and stations opened on 1 November 1847. The railway prospered: Chadderton was a mining town and there were numerous collieries around the town; and Oldham had, in 1838, 213 textile mills, more than Manchester. The railway system around Oldham was completed when the line to Rochdale from Mumps opened on 12 August 1863, and the branch to Royton was completed on 21 March 1864. Soon the railway led to all of Oldham's five railway stations: Werneth, Central, Mumps, Clegg Street, and Glodwick Road, as well as linking stations at Lees, Derker and Royton. On 12 August 1914 a goods and coal depot was opened at Chadderton.

Decline
By the 1930s road transport was taking over, and the cotton mills and collieries were closing. Broadway, the new arterial road (A663), was opened, and the significance of the line was lost.  The line to Manchester via Hollinwood, which had been opened on 17 May 1880, and which was much less steeply graded, took most of the traffic: from 1958 only one passenger service (an early morning train from Rochdale to Manchester) had been using the line.

Closure
Following the Beeching Report in 1963, the line was set to close. It did so, to all traffic between Chadderton Junction and Oldham Werneth on 7 January 1963. Oldham Central Station closed later in the 1960s. Soon after, on 13 March 1964, saw the pulling up and scrapping of the rails and other railway goods on the Middleton Junction and Oldham Branch Railway. The Chadderton goods and coal depot remained open at this stage as a short freight only branch from Middleton Junction. Over the years the rest of the line which went to the Chadderton depot was closed and scrapped, and the countryside slowly took over. Over 40 years later the landscape has irreversibly changed back to other uses: apart from an area where the old line entered a cutting, and where the old Johnny Whitehead Bridge could still be used as a crossing point for ramblers until the recent advent of the construction of the Foxdenton Business Park.

References

Further reading

Companies based in the Metropolitan Borough of Oldham
Lancashire and Yorkshire Railway
Early British railway companies
Closed railway lines in North West England
Railway lines opened in 1842
Chadderton
1842 establishments in England
Closed railway lines in Greater Manchester